Indiana Railway may refer to:
Indiana Railway (1880), predecessor of the Grand Trunk Western Railroad
Indiana Railway (1886), predecessor of the Chicago and Eastern Illinois Railroad
Indiana Railway (1887), predecessor of the Peoria and Eastern Railway (New York Central system)